Yohan Salwan Zetuna (born 31 May 2000) is an Iraqi professional footballer of Assyrian ethnicity who currently plays for Municipal Grecia. He is the younger brother of fellow footballer Yousuf Zetuna.

Career statistics

Club

Notes

References

2000 births
Living people
Assyrian footballers
Iraqi footballers
Iraqi expatriate footballers
Association football defenders
Liga de Expansión MX players
Alebrijes de Oaxaca players
Expatriate footballers in Mexico
Iraqi refugees